Bwacha is a constituency of the National Assembly of Zambia. It covers part of Kabwe District in Central Province.

List of MPs

Election results

2021

2001

References

Constituencies of the National Assembly of Zambia
Constituencies established in 1973
1973 establishments in Zambia